Final Countdown is an action game developed and published by Demonware Softwarehaus for the Amiga in 1990.

Reception

Final Countdown received mixed but mostly positive reviews, including 75% and 76% in Amiga Action, 70% in Amiga Format, 81% in Amiga Joker, 6/10 in Datormagazin, and 32% in PowerPlay.

References

External links
 Final Countdown at MobyGames
 Final Countdown at Hall of Light
 Final Countdown at Lemon Amiga

1990 video games
Amiga games
Amiga-only games
Fiction about near-Earth asteroids
Single-player video games
Science fiction video games
Video games developed in Germany
Video games featuring female protagonists